Cargolifter AG was a German company founded in 1996 to offer logistical services through point-to point transport of heavy and outsized loads. This service was based on the development of a heavy lift airship, the CL160, a  vessel designed to carry a  payload. The airship was never built and the company went bankrupt in July 2002. Today, shareholder-founded CL CargoLifter GmbH & Co. KG company seeks to continue selling the lighter-than-air technology. CargoLifter and Russia’s Aerosmena are among those developing huge airships that can lift up to 600 tons of freight while hovering above the ground or sea.

Cargolifter AG was founded by a group of influential engineers and scientists in 1996, and its main goal was to promote airships and develop technologies for their use as a lifting mechanism for transporting heavy and bulky goods to hard-to-reach places. As 1 cubic meter of helium has a buoyancy of roughly 1 kg, the size of a craft required to lift heavy loads is considerable.

History

Company 
Cargolifter AG was created on 1 September 1996 in Wiesbaden, Germany. A public stock offering took place in May 2000, and the resulting shareholder structure was characterized by a high proportion of small investors, attracted by substantial press coverage of the new breakthrough technologies being promised.

Hangar 
The hangar for production and operation of the CL160 and engineering team facilities were built on the former Soviet Air Force base at Brand-Briesen Airfield, Brandenburg, acquired to enable development and operations. The hangar was also equipped with a  cutting table to manufacture the airship's envelope. After the company went bankrupt, a tropical theme park was opened there.

Airship 
The first CL 160 airship was never built, though a considerable amount of design and development work was undertaken. The technical complexity (something akin to designing an airliner with less vetted technology) along with limited funding (a fraction of the funding typically available for the development of new airliners), and short development timeline meant that program challenges were underestimated, making the project relatively risky.

A small crewed prototype named 'Joey' was built in order to test project concepts on a reduced scale. Another aircraft, the "CL 75 Aircrane" transportation balloon prototype, of similar size (61 m in diameter) and height (87 m) to the CL 160, was built but destroyed in a storm in July 2002. Despite the setback, an agreement was reached with Boeing in 2002 for the joint study of a lighter-than-air stratospheric platform.

The  prototype, filled with 110,000 m3 of helium, was taken out of the hangar for the first time in October 2001. It represented a new stage in full-scale experimental purposes. The loadframe of this unit was engineered by American company AdvanTek International LLC, on behalf of Cargolifter AG. The sale of one CL 75 Aircrane along with 25 options (at a unit price of US$10 million), was later planned to the Canadian company Heavy Elevator Canada Inc., a deal with which CargoLifter AG was at least 20% involved. The contract never became effective.

Insolvency 
On 7 June 2002 the company announced insolvency, and liquidation proceedings began the following month. The fate of parts of the 300 million euros in shareholder funds from over 70,000 investors is still unclear.

In June 2003, the company's facilities were sold off for less than 20% of the construction costs. The airship hangar was converted to a 'tropical paradise'-themed indoor holiday resort called Tropical Islands, which opened in 2004.

The Skyship airship, which had been purchased by Cargolifter for training and research purposes, was sold to Swiss Skycruise and used in Athens for flights connected with the Olympic games held there.

Continuation 
Today, the CL CargoLifter GmbH & Co. KG company, founded by former Cargolifter AG shareholders, seeks to sell the lighter-than-air technology and is exploring the construction of smaller airships.

See also 
 Aeroscraft, a hybrid airship with the same aim as CargoLifter
 Walrus HULA
 Airlander

References

External links 

 The Cargo Lifter and the Tropical Island Resort 
 Website of CargoLifter KGaA

Defunct companies of Germany
Brandenburg
Aerospace companies of Germany